Pietro Francesco Montorio (1556–1643) was a Roman Catholic prelate who served as Apostolic Nuncio to Germany (1621–1624) and Bishop of Nicastro (1594–1620).

Biography
Pietro Francesco Montorio was born in Rome, Italy in 1556.
On 7 Feb 1594, he was appointed during the papacy of Pope Clement VIII as Bishop of Nicastro.
On 24 Feb 1594, he was consecrated bishop by Giovanni Battista Castrucci, Archbishop Emeritus of Chieti, with Angelo Cesi, Bishop of Todi, and Lorenzo Celsi, Bishop of Castro del Lazio, serving as co-consecrators. 
In 1620, he resigned as Bishop of Nicastro.
On 4 Aug 1621, he was appointed during the papacy of Pope Gregory XV as Apostolic Nuncio to Germany.
He served as Apostolic Nuncio to Germany until his resignation on 15 Jun 1624.
He died on 6 Jun 1643.

Episcopal succession
While bishop, he was the principal consecrator of:
Giovan Battista Curiale, Bishop of Nicastro (1632);
and the principal co-consecrator of:

References

External links and additional sources
 (for Chronology of Bishops) 
 (for Chronology of Bishops)  

17th-century Italian Roman Catholic bishops
Bishops appointed by Pope Clement VIII
Bishops appointed by Pope Gregory XV
1556 births
1643 deaths